Cameron is a Scottish surname and thus somewhat common throughout the English-speaking world.

There are several possible origins. One is from a Gaelic-language nickname, derived from cam ("crooked", "bent") and sròn or abhainn ("nose", "river"). Another is from any of the various places called Cameron, especially such places located in Fife, Edinburgh or Lennox, Scotland. The English-language surname can be rendered into Scottish Gaelic as: Camarran (masculine), Chamarran (feminine); or as Camshron (masculine) and Chamshron (feminine).

List of people with the surname

Alan Cameron (disambiguation)
Alexander Cameron (disambiguation)
Allan Cameron (disambiguation)
Angus Cameron (disambiguation)
Archie Cameron (1895–1956), Australian politician
Arti Cameron (born 1988), Guyanese model
Bill Cameron (disambiguation)
Cam Cameron (born 1961), American football head coach
Candace Cameron (born 1976), U.S. actress
Chantelle Cameron (born 1991), British boxer
Caressa Cameron (born 1987), American beauty
Carl Cameron (born 1961), U.S. television journalist
Charles Cameron (architect) (1745–1812), Scottish architect
Charlie Cameron (footballer, born 1994), Australian rules footballer
Christina Cameron (born ), Canadian writer and architectural historian
Colin Cameron (disambiguation)
Cordelia Cameron, Australian actor-manager
Cornelia C. Cameron (1911–1994), American geologist
David Cameron (disambiguation)
Daz Cameron (born 1997), American baseball player
Donald Cameron (disambiguation)
Doug Cameron (born 1951), Australian politician (ALP) and trade unionist
Douglas Colin Cameron (1854–1921), Canadian politician
Dove Cameron (born 1996), U.S. actress
Duncan Cameron (disambiguation)
Earl Cameron (1917–2020), Bermudian actor
Earl Cameron (broadcaster) (1915–2005), Canadian broadcaster
Elsie Cameron (died 1924), British murder victim
Elspeth Cameron (born 1943), Canadian writer
Eoin Cameron (1951–2016), Western Australian radio personality
Ewan Cameron (1922–1991), Scottish physician
Ewen Cameron (disambiguation)
Geoff Cameron (born 1985), U.S. footballer
Hector Charles Cameron (1878–1958), British paediatrician
Hector Clare Cameron (1843–1928), Scottish surgeon
Jeremy Cameron (born 1993), Australian rules footballer
Jeremy Cameron (author), British author
Horace Brakenridge Cameron (1905–1935), South African cricketer
Jake W. Cameron (1913–1999), American politician
James Cameron (disambiguation)
John Cameron (disambiguation)
John Allan Cameron (1938–2006), Canadian folksinger
Julia Cameron (born 1948), writer
Julia Margaret Cameron (1815–1879), British photographer
Kenneth D. Cameron (born 1949), U.S. astronaut
Kirk Cameron (born 1970), U.S. actor
Kyle Cameron (born 1997), footballer
Lisa Cameron (economist) (born 1967), Australian economist
Malcolm Cameron (disambiguation)
Margaret Cameron (disambiguation)
Marjorie Cameron (1922–1995), American actress, artist and occultist
Mark Cameron (disambiguation)
Matt Cameron (born 1962), U.S. hard rock musician
Matthew Crooks Cameron (1822–1887), Canadian politician
Maximilian Cameron aka Maxym Kryvonis (died 1648), one of the leaders of Khmelnytsky Uprising
Mike Cameron (born 1973), U.S. Major League Baseball player
Paul Cameron (born 1939), U.S. psychologist
Pero Cameron (born 1974), New Zealand professional basketball player
Phil Cameron (born 1972), British entrepreneur, owner of No.1 Traveller and former West End producer
Rafael Cameron (born 1951), Guyanese-American singer
Ralph H. Cameron (1863–1953), U.S. Senator from Arizona (1921–1927)
Reba Cameron (1885-1959), American nurse
Richard Cameron (disambiguation)
Robert Cameron (disambiguation)
Ron Cameron (disambiguation)
Rondo Cameron (1925–2001), economic historian
Roy Cameron (1923–2006), Australian public servant and diplomat
Ross Cameron (born 1965), Australian politician
Samantha Cameron (born 1971), British businesswoman, wife of politician David
Scotty Cameron (born 1962), American golf club maker primarily known for manufacturing putters
Sean Cameron (disambiguation)
Silver Donald Cameron (born 1937), Canadian writer
Simon Cameron (1799–1889), U.S. politician
Tassie Cameron, Canadian television writer
Verney Lovett Cameron (1844–1894), English traveller
Violet Cameron (1862–1919), English actress and singer
W. Bruce Cameron (born 1960), U.S. humorous writer

Fictional characters
Dr. Allison Cameron, in the television series House
Dr. David Cameron, in the television series Queer as Folk
Kiera Cameron, in the television series Continuum 
Tracker Cameron, in Degrassi: The Next Generation

See also
Clan Cameron, Scottish clan of the name
Cameron (given name), given name and surname
Cam (name), given name and surname

References 

Scottish surnames
Scottish Gaelic-language surnames
English-language surnames